The Adalbertstraße is a street in the Maxvorstadt, the district 3 of the Bavarian capital Munich. The street, which had been paved in 1825, was named in 1829 after Prince Adalbert of Bavaria (1828-1875), the fourth son of Ludwig I of Bavaria. Previously the Adalbertstraße had been called Letzte Straße ("Last Street"), since it formed the northern end of Maxvorstadt.

Route 
The Adalbertstraße runs from Ludwigstraße, north of the main building of Ludwig-Maximilian-University, westwards to Tengstraße. It crosses at right angles several streets of the geometrically implemented urban expansion. It leads past the, 1866 to 1869, Old North Cemetery. At its western end, the Adalbertstraße encounters the Tengstraße, southeast of the Church of St. Joseph.

Buildings 

Due to the damages during the Second World War and other changes, the Adalbertstraße shows a heterogeneous development. From the original two-storey buildings, only the house no. 14 from the period around 1827/30 has been preserved. The original buildings were replaced, starting in the 1860s, by mostly four-storey rental buildings and commercial buildings in the style of the Neo-Renaissance.

Historical buildings on the Adalbertstraße 

 Adalbertstraße 7/9
 Adalbertstraße 12
 Adalbertstraße 14
 Adalbertstraße 31
 Adalbertstraße 49
 Adalbertstraße 51
 Adalbertstraße 53
 Adalbertstraße 62
 Adalbertstraße 64
 Building group Adalbertstraße 70, 72, 76, 78, 80
 Adalbertstraße 90
 Adalbertstraße 96
 Adalbertstraße 98
 Adalbertstraße 100
 Adalbertstraße 106: Former child care Establishment
 Adalbertstraße 108

Famous residents 
 Anders Andersen-Lundby, painter, lived in Adalbertstraße 55
 Hermann Euler, painter
 Max Hofmann, resident poet, lived in Adalbertstraße 49
 Petra Nettelbeck, TV announcer
 Ernst Oppler, painter, lived in Adalbertstraße 6
 Gustav Rienäcker, painter, lived in Adalbertstraße 70 a
 Paul Roloff, painter, had a studio in Adalbertstraße 55
 Joseph Rosenthal, antiquarian, lived in Adalbertstraße 2c
 Otto Strützel, painter
 Karl Wolf, painter, grew up in the Adalbertstraße

References 

Streets in Munich
Maxvorstadt
Buildings and structures in Munich